The Australian Football League's 2009 finals series determined the top eight final positions of the 2009 AFL season over four weekends in September 2009, culminating with the 113th AFL/VFL Grand Final at the Melbourne Cricket Ground on 26 September 2009.  Geelong won the AFL premiership, for the second time in three years, following their twelve point win over St Kilda in the grand final.

The finals system 

The system is a final eight system. This system is different from the McIntyre final eight system, which was previously used by the AFL, and is currently used by the National Rugby League.

The top four teams in the eight receive what is popularly known as the "double chance" when they play in week-one qualifying finals. This means that even if a top-four team loses in the first week, it still remains in the finals, playing a semi-final the next week against the winner of an elimination final. The bottom four of the eight play knock-out games, in that only the winners survive and move on to the next week. Home-state advantage goes to the team with the higher seed in the first two weeks, to the qualifying final winners in the third week. Games in Victoria are played at the MCG, regardless of the team's usual home ground.

In the second week, the winners of the qualifying finals receive a bye to the third week. The losers of the qualifying final plays the elimination finals winners in a semi-final. In the third week, the winners of the semi-finals from week two play the winners of the qualifying finals in the first week. The winners of those matches move on to the Grand Final at the Melbourne Cricket Ground in Melbourne.

Qualification

While both St Kilda and Geelong were undefeated until a round 14 match-up, and the Saints threat of an undefeated season only broken after 19 wins, both teams dropped matches late in the home-and-away season. Collingwood finished strongly, winning 12 of its last 14 matches.

Summary of results

Week one

First qualifying final (St Kilda vs. Collingwood)

Second qualifying final (Geelong vs. Western Bulldogs)

First elimination final (Adelaide vs. Essendon)

Second elimination final (Brisbane vs. Carlton)

Week two

First semi-final (Collingwood vs. Adelaide)

Second semi-final (Western Bulldogs vs. Brisbane)

Week three

First preliminary final (St Kilda vs. Western Bulldogs)

Second preliminary final (Geelong vs. Collingwood)

Week four

Grand Final (St Kilda vs. Geelong)

See also 
2009 AFL season

Notes and references

External links
 AFL official website
 RealFooty by The Age (Melbourne) Online 
 SportsAustralia (news and views)

AFL Finals Series
Afl Finals Series, 2009